

Oman
 Mombasa – Nasr ibn Abdallah al-Mazru‘i, Wali of Mombasa (1698–1728)

Portugal
 Angola – Henrique de Figueiredo e Alarcão, Governor of Angola (1717–1722)
 Macau –
 D.Francisco de Alarcao Sotto-Maior, Governor of Macau (1714–1718)
 Antonio de Albuquerque Coelho, Governor of Macau (1718–1719)

Colonial governors
Colonial governors
1718